P. G. O'Neill (1924 – 19 January 2012) was a British academic and writer on Japanese language and Noh drama.

O'Neill was, with Ronald P. Dore, Sir Peter Parker and John R. McEwan, one of the "Dulwich boys", 30 sixth-formers who commenced study of Japanese at the School of Oriental and African Studies in May 1942.<ref>Bayly,Christopher Alan; Harper, Timothy Norman. 'Forgotten armies: the fall of British Asia, 1941-1945 2005 Page 259 "They were known as the 'Dulwich Boys', lodged as they were at Tin Tut's alma mater, Dulwich College."</ref>

O'Neill was Professor of Japanese at SOAS from 1968 until 1986.

Works
on Noh
 Collected Writings 
 A Guide to No Early No Drama Japan on Stageon Japanese language
 A Reader of Handwritten Japanese Japanese Kana Handbook A programmed course on respect language in modem Japanese. London: English Universities Press, 1966.
 Essential Kanji''. (a sequenced introduction to the Tōyō kanji 1946-1981)
 日英佛教語辞典 A Dictionary of Japanese Buddhist Terms, Based on References in Japanese Literature (with INAGAKI, Hisao 稲垣久雄, Kyoto 1984).
 中日英佛教語辞典 Chinese-Japanese-English-French Teaching Terms Lexicon. (enlarged edition of above)
 日本人名辞典 - dictionary of variant pronunciations of Japanese personal names and surnames.
 日本人名地名辞典 - personal names, surnames and place names dictionary

References

1924 births
2012 deaths
Academics of SOAS University of London
British Japanologists
People educated at Rutlish School